Hui of Jin may refer to:

Duke Hui of Jin (died 637 BC)
Emperor Hui of Jin (259–307)